Cinema Mudo (Portuguese for Silent Film) is the debut album by Brazilian rock band Os Paralamas do Sucesso. It was released in 1983 to critical acclaim, selling more than 90,000 copies.

The songs "Vital e a Sua Moto" and "Vovó Ondina É Gente Fina", the two main singles of the album, are homages to Vital Dias (the former drummer of the band) and bassist Bi Ribeiro's grandmother, respectively.

Track listing

Personnel
Os Paralamas do Sucesso
 Bi Ribeiro — bass
 Herbert Vianna — guitar, vocals, harpsichord in "Cinema Mudo"
 João Barone — drums, percussion

Additional musicians
 Léo Gandelman — metal arrangements in "Volúpia"
 Marcelo Sussekind  — harpsichord in "Cinema Mudo"
 Lulu Santos — slide guitar in "O que Eu Não Disse"
 Ruban — keyboards in "Foi o Mordomo"

References

1983 debut albums
EMI Records albums
Os Paralamas do Sucesso albums